Gabriele Moncini (born 26 April 1996) is an Italian footballer who plays as a forward for  club SPAL on loan from Benevento.

Career
Born in Pistoia, Tuscany, Moncini and Niccolò Arcangioli were signed by Piedmontese club Juventus in 2011, initially in temporary deal from Tuscan club Prato. In June 2012 Juventus signed Moncini outright, for €200,000. Moncini was the member of Allievi U17 team from 2011 to 2013. In August 2013 he was signed by Serie B club Cesena in a temporary deal.

Moncini was a member of Cesena's reserve in 2013–14 season. He also made his first team debut in Serie B on 8 November 2013. On 30 January 2014 Cesena signed Moncini in co-ownership deal, with Stefano Pellizzari moved to opposite direction. Both 50% registration rights of the players were valued for €1 million.

On 18 June 2014 Moncini joined Cesena outright for €750,000, as well as Pellizzari to Juventus outright for €750,000.

On 7 January 2016 Moncini was signed by Prato in a temporary deal. At the start of 2016–17 season Moncini briefly played for Cesena in pre-season friendly. However, on 4 August 2016 Moncini returned to Prato.

On 13 July 2017 Moncini signed a new four-year contract.

On 25 July 2018, Moncini signed with Serie A club SPAL for free.

On 23 January 2019, Moncini signed with Cittadella. On 23 February 2019 he scored a hat-trick against Lecce.

On 2 July 2019, Moncini returned to SPAL.

On 7 January 2020, Moncini signed to Serie B club Benevento until 30 June 2023, with an option for another year.

On 16 July 2022, he returned to SPAL once again, on loan with an obligation to buy.

References

External links
 Lega Serie B profile 
 

1996 births
People from Pistoia
Sportspeople from the Province of Pistoia
Living people
Italian footballers
Italy under-21 international footballers
Italy youth international footballers
Association football forwards
A.C. Prato players
Juventus F.C. players
A.C. Cesena players
S.P.A.L. players
A.S. Cittadella players
Benevento Calcio players
Serie A players
Serie B players
Serie C players
Footballers from Tuscany